Melbourne Victory Football Club, an Australian association football club based in Melbourne, Victoria, was founded in 2004. They became the only Victorian team in the inaugural seasons of the A-League, a professional football competition which commenced in 2005. The club's first team has competed in numerous nationally and internationally organised competitions, and all players who have played in one or more such match are listed below.

Leigh Broxham holds the record for the greatest number of appearances for Melbourne Victory. From 2005 to date, the Australian defender has played 375 times for the club. As of 2020, fourteen other players have made more than 100 appearances for Melbourne. The club's goalscoring record is held by Archie Thompson, who scored 97 goals in all competitions between 2005 and 2016.

Key
The list is ordered first by date of debut, and then if necessary in alphabetical order.
Appearances as a substitute are included.
Statistics are correct up to and including 18 September 2020. Where a player left the club permanently after this date, his statistics are updated to his date of leaving.

Players

International representatives
Players that represented their national team while contracted to Melbourne Victory.

References

External links
 Official website

 
Lists of soccer players by club in Australia
Melbourne sport-related lists
Association football player non-biographical articles